The Core Group is an informal intergovernmental organization made up of foreign powers involved in the politics of Haiti. It is made up of representatives of the United Nations, Brazil, Canada, France, Germany, Spain, the European Union, the United States, and the Organization of American States.

The group presents itself as providing advice on how to resolve Haiti's socioeconomic and political crises and improve democracy in the country. Its critics, including US diplomat Daniel Foote, a former member of the group, have accused it of undemocratic meddling in Haiti's internal affairs, including supporting former president Jovenel Moïse as his administration descended into despotism, and backing Ariel Henry to become Prime Minister over the then-incumbent Claude Joseph. Foote has also accused the group of prioritizing the stability of the country over the Haitian popular will.

References 

Foreign relations of Haiti
Intergovernmental organizations
Organizations with year of establishment missing